The 1996 Dura Lube 500 was the 30th and penultimate stock car race of the 1996 NASCAR Winston Cup Series, the 14th and penultimate race of the 1996 NASCAR Winston West Series, and the ninth iteration of the event. The race was held on Sunday, October 27, 1996, in Avondale, Arizona at Phoenix International Raceway, a 1-mile (1.6 km) permanent low-banked tri-oval race track. The race took the scheduled 312 laps to complete. In the late stages of the race, Petty Enterprises driver Bobby Hamilton would manage to make a late race pass and dominate to take his first career NASCAR Winston Cup Series victory and his only victory of the season. 

Heading into the final race of the season, the 1996 NAPA 500 at Atlanta Motor Speedway, points leader Terry Labonte would come into the race with a 47 point lead over teammate Jeff Gordon. To clinch the championship, Labonte would need to finish eighth or better.

Background 

Phoenix International Raceway – also known as PIR – is a one-mile, low-banked tri-oval race track located in Avondale, Arizona. It is named after the nearby metropolitan area of Phoenix. The motorsport track opened in 1964 and currently hosts two NASCAR race weekends annually. PIR has also hosted the IndyCar Series, CART, USAC and the Rolex Sports Car Series. The raceway is currently owned and operated by International Speedway Corporation.

The raceway was originally constructed with a 2.5 mi (4.0 km) road course that ran both inside and outside of the main tri-oval. In 1991 the track was reconfigured with the current 1.51 mi (2.43 km) interior layout. PIR has an estimated grandstand seating capacity of around 67,000. Lights were installed around the track in 2004 following the addition of a second annual NASCAR race weekend.

Entry list 

 (R) denotes rookie driver.

Qualifying 
Qualifying was originally scheduled to be split into two rounds. The first round was scheduled to be held on Friday, October 25, at 4:30 PM EST. However, only six drivers were able to set a lap before qualifying was rained out and postponed until Saturday, October 26, at 2:00 PM EST. Qualifying was eventually combined into only one round. Each driver would have one lap to set a time. For this specific race, positions 26-38 would be decided on time, and depending on who needed it, a select amount of positions were given to cars who had not otherwise qualified but were high enough in owner's points.

Six drivers would fail to qualify: Mark Krogh, Scott Gaylord, Larry Gunselman, Rich Woodland Jr., Joe Bean, and Bill McAnally.

Full qualifying results

Race results

References 

1996 NASCAR Winston Cup Series
NASCAR races at Phoenix Raceway
October 1996 sports events in the United States
1996 in sports in Arizona